
Gmina Ryglice is an urban-rural gmina (administrative district) in Tarnów County, Lesser Poland Voivodeship, in southern Poland.

The gmina contains part of the protected area called Pasmo Brzanki Landscape Park.

Villages
Apart from the town of Ryglice, Gmina Ryglice contains the villages and settlements of Bistuszowa, Joniny, Kowalowa, Lubcza, Uniszowa, Wola Lubecka and Zalasowa.

Neighbouring gminas
Gmina Ryglice is bordered by the gminas of Jodłowa, Pilzno, Skrzyszów, Szerzyny and Tuchów.

References
Polish official population figures 2006

Ryglice
Tarnów County